Phulbari, Nepal may refer to:

 Phulbari, Mechi
 Phulbari, Rapti